Raydon Wood railway station was a station in Suffolk, on a short branch line from Bentley Junction to Hadleigh. There was a goods shed on a passing loop which included a small siding on the south side of the station at the Bentley end.

Together with  it was extensively used for handling supplies in World War II for a nearby United States Army Air Forces base, later known as RAF Raydon.

The line opened in 1847 and closed to passenger traffic in 1932, with freight services lingering on until 1965.

The station building still stands and remains in use as a coal merchant's depot.

References

External links
 Raydon Wood station on navigable 1946 O. S. map
 The Story of Hadleigh's railway

Disused railway stations in Suffolk
Former Great Eastern Railway stations
Railway stations in Great Britain opened in 1847
Railway stations in Great Britain closed in 1932
1847 establishments in England
Babergh District